HMS Exeter was a Type 42 destroyer, the fifth ship of the Royal Navy to be named Exeter, after the city of Exeter in Devon. The vessel fought in the Falklands War and the first Gulf War, she was scrapped in 2011.

Design and construction
Exeter was the first of the slightly modified 'Batch 2' Type 42 destroyers which had weapons and sensor upgrades with no discernible hull modifications. The weapons and sensors fit was the first grouping of the 1022, 992Q and 1006 radars in a British warship.

The ship was built by Swan Hunter, and commissioned into the Royal Navy on 19 September 1980. In 1981 , fired the last Mk 1 Sea Slug missiles to allow Exeters new radars to fully integrate and align the superior Sea Dart missile against, high and low missile targets.

Early in her first commission, Exeter had a turquoise hull on and below the waterline; this was an experimental co-polymer paint which was only available in a few non-standard colours at the time. The light-blue 'boot topping' visible on the waterline was eventually repainted to standard brick red/black during her first docking period, after the Falklands War.

Operational history

1981-1990
During the conflict, Exeter shot down three Argentine aircraft (two A-4C Skyhawks on 30 May, and a Learjet 35A on 7 June; all with Sea Dart missiles). She may also have shot down an Exocet missile on 30 May. Between 1982 and 1984 she was commanded by Captain Hugh Balfour.

1991-2000
Exeter also served in Operation Granby during the 1991 Gulf War, under the command of Captain Nigel Essenhigh. Among her roles was the air defence of the US battleships bombarding enemy positions.

In autumn 1998, she emerged from a major refit in Rosyth dockyard. After post refit trials she undertook Operational Sea Training in the spring of 1999 and a Joint Maritime Course with Sea Dart high seas firings in June of that year. September 1999 saw her deploy on Armilla patrol. She was alongside in Dubai for the Millennium and remained on station until relieved by a large Task Group led by the aircraft carrier  in February 2000, arriving back at Portsmouth the following month.

2001-2008
As the last remaining Royal Navy ship in commission to have served in the Falklands, Exeter attended the 25th-anniversary commemorations of the Falklands War in Newquay, Cornwall in 2007.

In May 2008, Exeter visited London to provide the centerpiece for the launch of a new James Bond novel; the day before Devil May Care was launched, the press party to publicise the launch of the book included Tuuli Shipster bringing copies up the River Thames on a speedboat for a party on Exeter, while two Lynx helicopters circled the ship.

Disposal

On 30 July 2008, Exeter was placed in a state of 'extended readiness' at HMNB Portsmouth, until being decommissioned there on 27 May 2009.

In early 2010, Exeter was used to assist with the training of new naval base tugs. She was put up for sale by auction on 28 March 2011 and finally towed away to be scrapped at Leyal Ship Recycling in Turkey on 23 September 2011, provoking some criticism from former crew members who were upset that the Ministry of Defence had apparently failed to inform them of the ship's fate.

Affiliations 
 The Rifles
 Exeter College, Oxford
 Worshipful Company of Plaisterers

References

External links 

 Navy News article

Cold War destroyers of the United Kingdom
Falklands War naval ships of the United Kingdom
1978 ships
Type 42 destroyers of the Royal Navy
Gulf War ships of the United Kingdom
Ships built by Swan Hunter
Ships built on the River Tyne